Ponce I, Count of Urgell (died 1243) was Count of Urgell in Catalonia from 1236 until his death.

He was the first Count of Urgell from the Cabrera family.

He also held the Viscounty of Àger.

He was succeeded as Count by his two sons.

Family
He married María González Girón and had issue:
 Ponce (Catalan: Ponç), died young;
 Ermengol IX c. 1235–1243, count of Urgell, viscount of Cabrera & Àger.
 Álvaro (Catalan: Àlvar) 1239–1268, count of Urgell, viscount of Cabrera & Àger.
 Guerau 1242–1271;
 Eleanor (Catalan: Elionor);
 Marquessa (Catalan: Marquesa).

Notes 
Chaytor, H. J. A History of Aragon and Catalonia. London: Methuen, 1933.
biography (Spanish)

1243 deaths
Counts of Urgell
13th-century Catalan people